Gami may refer to:
Gämi, a village and suburb on the southeastern outskirts of Ashgabat, Turkmenistan
An alternative spelling for kami